The following is a list of episodes for the Australian television talk show programme Rove LA, hosted by Rove McManus. , 10 episodes of Rove LA have aired.

Series overview

Episodes

Season 1 (2011)

Season 2 (2012)
Rove LA was renewed for second run of episodes to air in mid-2012 with a longer series run than the first season.
The second season began airing 30 September 2012.

References

Lists of Australian non-fiction television series episodes